Allostatic load is "the wear and tear on the body" which accumulates as an individual is exposed to repeated or chronic stress. The term was coined by Bruce McEwen and Eliot Stellar in 1993. It represents the physiological consequences of chronic exposure to fluctuating or heightened neural or neuroendocrine response which results from repeated or prolonged chronic stress.

Regulatory model

The term allostatic load is "the wear and tear on the body" which accumulates as an individual is exposed to repeated or chronic stress.
It was coined by McEwen and Stellar in 1993.

The term is part of the regulatory model of allostasis, where the predictive regulation or stabilisation of internal sensations in response to stimuli is ascribed to the brain. Allostasis involves the regulation of homeostasis in the body to decrease physiological consequences on the body. Predictive regulation refers to the brain's ability to anticipate needs and prepare to fulfill them before they arise.

Part of efficient regulation is the reduction of uncertainty. Humans naturally do not like feeling as if surprise is inevitable. Because of this, we constantly strive to reduce the uncertainty of future outcomes, and allostasis helps us do this by anticipating needs and planning how to satisfy them ahead of time. But it takes a considerable amount of the brain's energy to do this, and if it fails to resolve the uncertainty, the situation may become chronic and result in the accumulation of allostatic load.

The concept of allostatic load provides that "the neuroendocrine, cardiovascular, neuroenergetic, and emotional responses become persistently activated so that blood flow turbulences in the coronary and cerebral arteries, high blood pressure, atherogenesis, cognitive dysfunction and depressed mood accelerate disease progression." All long-standing effects of continuously activated stress responses are referred to as allostatic load. Allostatic load can result in permanently altered brain architecture and systemic pathophysiology.

Allostatic load minimizes an organism's ability to cope with and reduce uncertainty in the future.

Types
McEwen and Wingfield propose two types of allostatic load with different etiologies and distinct consequences:-

Whereas both types of allostatic load are associated with increased release of cortisol and catecholamines, they differentially affect thyroid homeostasis: Concentrations of the thyroid hormone triiodothyronine are decreased in type 1 allostasis, but elevated in type 2 allostasis. This may result from an interaction of type 2 allostatic load with the set point of thyroid function.

Special situations may involve a blend of both type 1 and type 2 allostatic load. Examples include exhausting exercise and adaptation to antarctic conditions.

Measurement 
Allostatic load is generally measured through a composite index of indicators of cumulative strain on several organs and tissues, primarily biomarkers associated with the neuroendocrine, cardiovascular, immune and metabolic systems.

Indices of allostatic load are diverse across studies and are frequently assessed differently, using different biomarkers and different methods of assembling an allostatic load index. Allostatic load is not unique to humans and may be used to evaluate the physiological effects of chronic or frequent stress in non-human primates as well. The rat cumulative allostatic load measure (rCALM) is a marker for allostatic load in rodents.

In the endocrine system, the increase or repeated levels of stress results in elevated levels of the hormone Corticotropin-Releasing Factor (CRH), which is associated with activation of the HPA axis. The Hypothalamic–pituitary–adrenal axis is the central stress response system responsible for the modification of inflammatory responses throughout the body. Prolonged stress levels can lead to decreased levels of cortisol in the morning and increased levels in the afternoon, leading to greater daily output of cortisol which in the long term increases blood sugar levels.

In the nervous system, structural and functional abnormalities are a result of chronic prolonged stress. The increase in stress levels causes a shortening of dendrites in a neuron. Therefore, the shortening of dendrites causes a decrease in attention. Chronic stress also causes greater response to fear of the unlearned in the nervous system, and fear conditioning.

In the immune system, the increase in levels of chronic stress results in the elevation of inflammation. The increase in inflammation levels is caused by the ongoing activation of the sympathetic nervous system. The impairment of cell-mediated acquired immunity is also a factor resulting in the immune system due to chronic stress.

The R package pscore provides functions for simplified and automated calculation and statistical evaluation of physiological components of the metabolic syndrome symptom score (MSSS) and allostatic load.

Relationship to allostasis and homeostasis 
The largest contribution to the allostatic load is the effect of stress on the brain. Allostasis is the system which helps to achieve homeostasis. Homeostasis is the regulation of physiological processes, whereby systems in the body respond to the state of the body and to the external environment. The relationship between allostasis and allostatic load is the concept of anticipation. Anticipation can drive the output of mediators. Examples of mediators include hormones and cortisol. Excess amounts of such mediators will result in an increase in allostatic load, contributing to anxiety and anticipation.

Allostasis and allostatic load are related to the amount of health-promoting and health-damaging behaviours like for example cigarette smoking, consumption of alcohol, poor diet and physical inactivity.

Three physiological processes cause an increase in allostatic load:

 Frequent stress: the magnitude and frequency of response to stress is what determines the level of allostatic load which affects the body.
 Failed shut-down: the inability of the body to shut off while stress accelerates and levels in the body exceed normal levels, for example, elevated blood pressure. 
 Inadequate response: the failure of the body systems to respond to challenge, for example, excess levels of inflammation due to inadequate endogenous glucocorticoid responses.

The importance of homeostasis is to regulate the stress levels encountered on the body to reduce allostatic load.

Dysfunctional allostasis causes allostatic load to increase which may, over time, lead to disease, sometimes with decompensation of the allostatically controlled problem. Allostatic load effects can be measured in the body. When tabulated in the form of allostatic load indices using sophisticated analytical methods, it gives an indication of cumulative lifetime effects of all types of stress on the body.

Causes of allostatic load 
Type 1 allostatic load represents the adaptive response to an absolute lack in energy, glutathione and several macronutrients. It also includes predictive responses, e. g. in hibernation, infection and depression.

Type 2 allostatic load results from an expected mismatch of energy demand and supply. It is triggered by psychosocial stress, e. g. due to low socioeconomic status, major life events and environmental stressors. This association explains the increased risk for cardiovascular disease and chronic conditions like obesity, diabetes, hypertension and psychotic conditions in subjects that were exposed to psychosocial trauma, social disadvantage and discrimination. Socio-cultural mechanisms tend to augment this relation by perpetuating disparity even in the quality of health care, which tends to be inferior in socially disadvantaged population strata.

Implications of allostatic load on health 
Increased allostatic load constitutes a significant health hazard. Several studies documented a strong association of allostatic load to the incidence of coronary heart disease, to surrogate markers of cardiovascular health and to hard endpoints, including cause-specific and all-cause mortality. Mediators connecting allostatic load to morbidity and mortality include the function of the autonomic nervous system, cytokines and stress hormones, e.g. catecholamines, cortisol and thyroid hormones.

Reducing risk
To reduce and manage high allostatic load, an individual should pay attention to structural and behavioural factors. Structural factors include the social environment, and access to health services. Behavioural factors include diet, physical health and tobacco smoking, which can lead to chronic disease. Actions such as tobacco smoking are brought about from the stress levels that an individual experiences. Therefore, controlling stress levels from the beginning, for example by not leading to tobacco smoking, will reduce the chance of chronic disease development and high allostatic load.

Low socio-economic status (SES) affects allostatic load and therefore, focusing on the causes of low SES will reduce allostatic load levels. Reducing societal polarisation, material deprivation, and psychological demands on health helps to manage allostatic load. Support from the community and the social environment can manage high allostatic load. In addition, healthy lifestyle that encompasses a broad array of lifestyle change including healthy eating and regular physical exercise may reduce allostatic load. Empowering financial help from the government allows people to gain control and improve their psychological health. Improving inequalities in health decreases the stress levels and improves health by reducing high allostatic load on the body.

Interventions can include encouraging sleep quality and quantity, social support, self-esteem and wellbeing, improving diet, avoiding alcohol or drug consumption and participating in physical activity. Providing cleaner and safer environments and the incentive towards a higher education will reduce the chance of stress and improve mental health significantly, therefore, reducing the onset of high allostatic load.

Allostatic load differs by sex and age, and the social status of an individual. Protective factors could, at various times of an individual's life span, be implemented to reduce stress and, in the long run, eliminate the onset of allostatic load. Protective factors include parental bonding, education, social support, healthy workplaces, a sense of meaning towards life and choices being made, and positive feelings in general.

See also 
 Holmes and Rahe stress scale
 Psychoneuroimmunology
 Shift-and-persist model
 Weathering hypothesis

References 

Neurobiological brain disorder
Stress (biology)
Anxiety disorders
Immunodeficiency